Bopper or boppers may refer to:
 Bopper, someone involved with bebop music
 The Boppers, a Swedish music group that had a number-one single in Sweden

See also
 The Big Bopper, early rock-a-roll star
 Teenybopper, a teenage subculture
 Deely bopper, head ornamentation
 Sock'em boppers, a children's toy
 Little Boppers and Monster Boppers, toys made by Worlds of Wonder
 Beanie Boppers and Teenie Beanie Boppers, toy doll variations of Beanie Babies made by Ty Inc. from 2001 to 2005
 
 Bop (disambiguation)
 Popper (disambiguation)